John Bernard Hofsiss (September 28, 1950 – September 13, 2016) was an American theatre, film, and television director.  He received a Tony Award for his direction of The Elephant Man on Broadway, the youngest director to have ever received it at the time. The production also garnered him a Drama Desk Award, Outer Critics Circle Award, Obie Award, and New York Drama Critics Circle Award. Director of  Family Secrets in the year 1984; starring Melissa Gilbert, James Spader, Stefanie Powers, and Maureen Stapleton.

Biography
John Bernard Hofsiss was born on September 28, 1950, in Brooklyn. He grew up in New York City, as a Catholic, and served as an altar boy, which he has said was his "first experience of theatre". He was a 1971 graduate of Georgetown University.

While at Georgetown University he co-wrote and directed an original student musical "Senior Prom." This went on to be staged for a 3 year run at the "O" Street Theater formerly the Washington Theater Club. After a directing stint at the Folger Theatre in Washington, D.C., he became a casting director in New York for several years.  He then directed The Best of Families, a mini-series, for television in 1977.  He also directed for TV Out of Our Father's House (1978), 3 by Cheever: The Sorrows of Gin (1979), The Elephant Man (1982), "Family Secrets (1984), and Cat on a Hot Tin Roof (1985). In 1982 he directed the film I'm Dancing as Fast as I Can.

In 1985, Hofsiss dived into a pool and had a spinal cord injury, resulting in paralysis up to his mid-chest. He spent eight months at the Rusk Institute of Rehabilitation Medicine and used a wheelchair. Just months after the accident he returned to the theater scene, directing All the Way Home at the Berkshire Theatre Festival. Hofsiss appeared in the documentary The Needs of Kim Stanley in 2005.

At the end of his life, Hofsiss was teaching directing at HB Studio in New York City. The last play he directed was Design for Living in 2015, supported by the  Noël Coward Foundation.

Hofsiss spoke candidly about the effect disability had on his life and work in the book Chronicles of Courage: Very Special Artists written by Jean Kennedy Smith and George Plimpton and published by Random House.

Death
Hofsiss died at his home in Manhattan on September 13, 2016, at the age of 65.

References

External links
 
 
 

1950 births
2016 deaths
American film directors
American television directors
American theatre directors
American people with disabilities
American Roman Catholics
American casting directors
Drama Desk Award winners
Georgetown University alumni
Obie Award recipients
Tony Award winners
People with paraplegia